Noctuides is a genus of snout moths. It was described by Otto Staudinger in 1892.

Species
 Noctuides albifascia
 Noctuides circumlucens (Dyar, 1914)
 Noctuides griseoviridis
 Noctuides melanochyta
 Noctuides melanophia Staudinger, 1892
 Noctuides thurivora

References

Epipaschiinae
Pyralidae genera